Skaneateles is a town in Onondaga County, New York, United States. The population was 7,112 at the 2020 census. The name is from the Iroquois term for the adjacent Skaneateles Lake, which means "long lake." The town is on the western border of the county and includes a village, also named Skaneateles. Both the town and village are southwest of Syracuse.

History 

The area was part of the former Central New York Military Tract. The town of Skaneateles was formed in 1830 from the town of Marcellus. Early turnpikes facilitated development. The town was noted for participation in reform movements before the Civil War.

The Skaneateles Community in 1843 acquired and successfully operated a large farm and developed small industries. It ultimately failed because of internal difficulties, as well as external concern about its unorthodox social practices. Locally it was sometimes called "No God," because of the atheistic views of members. The Skaneateles Community published a newspaper, the "Comunitist"  between 1844 and 1846, when the community dissolved. Buildings are extant, known as "Community Place," now serving as a bed-and-breakfast.

Some Skaneateles men volunteered for the ill-fated Upper Canada Rebellion (1837) to liberate Canada and were imprisoned by the British in Australia. Quaker congregations were involved in abolition activity. Underground Railroad sites have been documented in Skaneateles. Although the larger city of Syracuse nearby was known nationally as a center of abolition and Underground Railroad activity, Skaneateles was said (by Beauchamp, an early historian) to have "eclipsed Syracuse as an anti-slavery town."

On July 4, 1876, resident John Dodgson Barrow delivered the centennial address in Skaneateles recounting the history of the village up to that time. In 1891, he had it printed in Syracuse as a 20-page book.

The Brook Farm, Community Place, and Kelsey-Davey Farm are listed on the National Register of Historic Places.

Geography
According to the United States Census Bureau, the town has a total area of 48.8 square miles (126.3 km2), of which 42.7 square miles (110.5 km2)  (87.49%) is land and 6.1 square miles (15.8 km2)  (12.51%) is water.

Demographics

As of the 2020 United States census, there are 7,112 people and 1,998 families residing in the town.  The population density is 171.7 people per square mile (66.3/km2).  There are 3,233 housing units at an average density of 75.8 per square mile (29.3/km2).  The racial makeup of the town is 93.56% White, 0.15% Black or African-American, 0.25% Native American and Alaska Native, 0.96% Asian, 0.62% from other races, and 4.46% from two or more races. Hispanic or Latino people of any race also make up 2.31% of the population.

It was estimated in 2021 that there are 3,047 households in Skaneateles, with which 20.2% have children under the age of 18 living with them, 49.1% are married couples living together, 30.8% are non-families, and 25.9% are made up of individuals. The average household size is 2.33 and the average family size is 2.87.

In 2021, it was also estimated that 21.1% of people in Skaneateles are under the age of 18, 3.5% from 18 to 24, 26.8% from 25 to 44, 25.8% from 45 to 64, and 29.7% who are 65 years of age or older.  The median age is 51.1 years old.

As of 2021, the median household income is estimated to be $90,762, and the median family income is estimated to be $120,667. It is also estimated that 5.1% of the population and 1.9% of families are below the poverty line.

Communities and locations in the Town of Skaneateles 
Highland Way – A neighborhood just east of Skaneateles village on Onondaga Rd.
Jones Beach – A hamlet on the east shore of Skaneateles Lake on NY-41.
Long Bridge – A hamlet at the north town line, north of Mottville.
Mandana – A hamlet down the west side of the lake.
Mottville – A hamlet two miles north of Skaneateles village on Jordan Street and north of Willow Glen.
Shepard Settlement – A farming hamlet.
Skaneateles – A village at the north end of Skaneateles Lake.
 Skaneateles Falls – A hamlet northwest of Skaneateles village on Skaneateles Creek.
Thornton Grove – A lakeshore neighborhood on the west shore of the lake south of Winding Way.
Thornton Heights – A lakeshore neighborhood on the west shore of the lake home of the Veggie Stand.
Wicks Corners – A neighborhood on the west town line, northwest of Skaneateles village.
Willow Glen – A neighborhood on Old Seneca Turnpike, north of Skaneateles village.
Winding Way – A neighborhood on the west shore of Skaneateles Lake.

Notable people
 John Dodgson Barrow (1824-1906),  Hudson River School artist
 Mary Elizabeth Beauchamp (1825–1903), educator and author
 Neilia Hunter Biden (July 28, 1942 – December 18, 1972), first wife of Joe Biden, mother of Beau Biden and Hunter Biden
 Barry Crimmins (1953-2018), comedian, activist
 Clara Cannucciari (1915-2013), web vlogger, author
 Sheldon Dibble (1809-1845), missionary
 Searles G. Shultz, (April 29, 1897 – January 23, 1976) American Lawyer and Politician
 Marshall I. Ludington, (July 4, 1839 - July 26, 1919) Quartermaster General of the United States Army
 James Reuel Smith (1852–1935) photographer who worked in the late 19th C. to early 20th C., known for his documentary photographs of springs and wells in New York City.

References

Bibliography
 Beauchamp, William. "Notes of other days in Skaneateles", Skaneateles Democrat, 1876. Cornell Library New York State Literature
 Hamm, Thomas D., God's Government Begun:  The Society of Universal Inquiry and Reform, 1842-1846. Indian University Press,  1995.
 Hamm, Thomas D.  "Skaneateles Community." Encyclopedia of New York State,  Syracuse University Press, 2005.
 Fogarty, Robert.  "Utopian and Intentional Communities," The Encyclopedia of New York State.  Syracuse University Press, 2005.
 Jay, Gregory S., "America the scrivener: Deconstruction and the subject of literary history." Cornell University Press, 1990.
 Smithana, Don.   "America—Land of the Rising Sun, 1989 Tokuma Shoten, Tokyo

External links
Town of Skaneateles official website
Khim Winship. ""The Town of Skaneateles."  2005.
History, Town of Skaneateles
Skaneateles area Chamber of Commerce
Skaneateles Town Court
Skaneateles Underground Railroad Sites

Syracuse metropolitan area
Towns in Onondaga County, New York
Populated places on the Underground Railroad